The Family among the Australian Aborigines: A Sociological Study is a 1913 anthropological book by the Polish scholar Bronisław Malinowski.

The book was based on materials Malinowski collected and wrote in the years 1909-1911. It was well received not just by contemporary reviewers, but also by scholars generations later. In 1963, in his foreword to its new edition, John Arundel Barnes called it an epochal work, and noted how it discredited the previously held theory that Australian Aborigines have no institution of family.

References

External links 
 The book at the Internet Archive

1913 non-fiction books
Anthropology books
Books about families
Books about Australia
Indigenous Australian society
Books by Bronisław Malinowski